Sheffield High School may refer to:

Australia 
Sheffield District High School — Sheffield, Tasmania

United Kingdom 
Sheffield High School, South Yorkshire — Sheffield, England
Sheffield Collegiate School — Sheffield, England

United States 
Sheffield High School (Alabama) — Sheffield, Alabama
Sheffield High School (Tennessee) — Memphis, Tennessee
Sheffield Middle/High School — Sheffield, Pennsylvania
Sheffield Career and Technology Center — Memphis, Tennessee
Sheffield-Chapin Community High School — Sheffield, Iowa